"Baddest Boy" is a song by E.M.E acts Wizkid, Skales, and Banky W. It was released on April 2, 2012, serving as the lead single from the label's compilation album Empire Mates State of Mind (2012). A leaked version of the song, featuring vocals from Wizkid and Skales, surfaced on the internet prior to its official release. According to OkayAfrica, "Baddest Boy" is a banger with synths that resemble a heavily screwed “Akpako Master”. The song was produced by Legendury Beatz.

Background and recording
In an interview with Beverly Bryan of MTVIggy, Wizkid was asked about the writing and recording process of the album's lead single. His response was: "So, I went into the studio and I heard the beat. And Skales starts working on this verse. And then I came on. And then Banky did his verse. And then the song came out and it’s a successful song. I’m thankful for that."

Music video
The accompanying music video for "Baddest Boy" was directed by Clarence Peters. It was uploaded to YouTube on July 18, 2012 and features cameo appearances from Shaydee, Niyola and DJ Xclusive.  According to Nigeria Trends, the music video was shot in a private jet and hangar.

Accolades
The music video for the song was nominated for Most Gifted Duo/Group/Featuring Video at the 2013 Channel O Music Video Awards. The award ceremony was held at the Walter Sisulu Square, in Kliptown, Soweto on November 30, 2013. "Baddest Boy" earned E.M.E acts a nomination for Best Collabo at The Headies 2013.

Track listing
 Digital single

References

2012 songs
2012 singles
Wizkid songs
Banky W. songs
Song recordings produced by Legendury Beatz
Skales songs
Songs written by Wizkid
Nigerian afropop songs